Alison Owen-Spencer (later Kiesel, born January 5, 1953) is a retired American cross-country skier. She competed in the 5 km, 10 km and relay events at the 1972 and 1980 Winter Olympics with the best individual result of 22nd place in 1980. She finished seventh in the 1978–79 World Cup (a concept under test at the time by the FIS), winning a 5 km race at Cable, Wisconsin in December 1978. In 1979 she won the national 5 km and 10 km titles.

Owen-Spencer studied at Alaska Methodist University, where she met her future husband, Joe Spencer, but the marriage did not last.

Cross-country skiing results

Olympic Games

World Championships

References

1953 births
Living people
American female cross-country skiers
Olympic cross-country skiers of the United States
Cross-country skiers at the 1972 Winter Olympics
Cross-country skiers at the 1980 Winter Olympics
20th-century American women